Burr Powell Harrison (July 2, 1904 – December 29, 1973) was a Virginia lawyer, judge and Democratic politician who was a member of the Byrd Organization and served as U.S. Congressman representing Virginia's 7th congressional district (as had his father).

Early and family life
Born in Winchester, Virginia to Virginia lawyer and soon-to-be Congressman Thomas W. Harrison and his wife, Burr Harrison was descended from the First Families of Virginia and named for his great-great grandfather Burr William Harrison (1793-1865) who represented Loudoun County in the Virginia General Assembly in the 1840s and great-great-great-great grandfather Burr Harrison (patriot) (1734-1790), who represented Prince William County and fought in the American Revolutionary War. This Burr Harrison attended the public schools, then Woodberry Forest School, Virginia Military Institute, Hampden-Sydney College, and the University of Virginia. He graduated from Georgetown University Law School, Washington, D.C., in 1926.

Career

Harrison was admitted to the Virginia bar the same year and commenced practice in Winchester, Virginia with his father (who died in 1935). Harrison was the attorney for Frederick County in 1932–1940. During the years 1940–1943, Harrison represented Frederick County (part-time) in Senate of Virginia. His colleagues elected him as judge of the seventeenth judicial circuit and the corporation court of Winchester in 1943–1946.

Voters of Virginia's 7th congressional district (which his father had represented during World War I and before the Great Depression) elected Harrison as a Democrat to the Seventy-ninth and to the Eightieth Congress, initially by special election to fill the vacancy caused by the resignation of United States Representative A. Willis Robertson (who successfully ran for election as U.S. Senator). Voters reelected Harrison to the seven succeeding Congresses (November 5, 1946 – January 3, 1963). He was a member of the House Un-American Activities Committee during the McCathy era. Like his father, Harrison was a member of the Byrd Organization led by Virginia's U.S. Senator Harry F. Byrd (of Winchester) and accordingly supported Massive Resistance to the U.S. Supreme Court decisions in Brown v. Board of Education. He signed the 1956 Southern Manifesto that opposed the desegregation of public schools. Harrison did not seek his party's renomination to the Eighty-eighth Congress in 1962, but instead resumed his legal practice in Winchester, Virginia. Fellow Democrat John O. Marsh, Jr. succeeded to the Congressional seat.

Death and legacy
Harrison died in Winchester on December 29, 1973, and was interred in Winchester's Mount Hebron Cemetery.

Electoral history

1946; Harrison was elected to the U.S. House of Representatives in a special election with 62.53% of the vote, defeating Republican Karl Jenkins.  He was simultaneously elected in the general election with 62.32% of the vote, defeating Republican Jenkins.
1948; Harrison was re-elected with 60.43% of the vote, defeating Republican Stephen D. Timberlake.
1950; Harrison was re-elected with 69.41% of the vote, defeating Republican Jacob A. Garber.
1952; Harrison was re-elected with 79.09% of the vote, defeating Republican Glenn W. Ruebush.
1954; Harrison was re-elected with 74.17% of the vote, defeating Republican John P. Ruddick.
1956; Harrison was re-elected with 69.04% of the vote, defeating Republican A.R. Dunning.
1958; Harrison was re-elected with 76.64% of the vote, defeating Independent Henry A. Oder.
1960; Harrison was re-elected unopposed.

See also
 List of members of the House Un-American Activities Committee

Sources

1904 births
1973 deaths
Georgetown University Law Center alumni
Virginia lawyers
Democratic Party Virginia state senators
Virginia state court judges
Politicians from Winchester, Virginia
Democratic Party members of the United States House of Representatives from Virginia
20th-century American lawyers
20th-century American politicians
Woodberry Forest School alumni
20th-century American judges
Burials at Mount Hebron Cemetery (Winchester, Virginia)
Virginia circuit court judges